This is a list of South African television-related events in 2018.

Events
4 February - Strictly Come Dancing moves from SABC to M-Net under the new name Dancing with the Stars. Chris Jaftha will host the show along with Tracey Lange.

Debuts

Domestic
4 February - Dancing with the Stars (M-Net) (2018–present)

International
26 February - // Trulli Tales (Disney Junior)
23 April -  DuckTales (2017) (Disney XD)
23 April -  Kitty Is Not a Cat (Disney Channel)
29 September - / Apple & Onion (Cartoon Network)
18 November - / ALVINNN!!! and the Chipmunks (eToonz)

Changes of network affiliation

Television shows

1980s
Good Morning South Africa (1985-present)
Carte Blanche (1988–present)

1990s
Top Billing (1992–present)
Generations (1994–present)
Isidingo (1998–present)

2000s
Idols South Africa (2002–present)
Rhythm City (2007–present)
SA's Got Talent (2009–present)

2010s
The Voice South Africa (2016–present)

Ending this year

Births

Deaths

Joshua David Vassen (Young O.G) 9 November (18 years)

See also
2018 in South Africa

 
2018 in South Africa